The 2015 CARIFTA Games took place between 3 and 6 April 2015.  The event was held at the Silver Jubilee Stadium in Bird Rock, south-eastern suburb of Basseterre, Saint Kitts and Nevis.  During the games, the stadium was officially renamed the "Kim Collins National Athletic Stadium" in honour of the country's 2003 100m world champion Kim Collins.  It was the second time after 2008 that the event was hosted by Saint Kitts and Nevis.

A report of the event was given for the IAAF.

Austin Sealy Award
The Austin Sealy Trophy for the most outstanding athlete of the games was awarded to Mary Fraser, Barbados. She won three gold medals, 800 m and 1500m in the youth (U-18) category, as well as 3000m open for both junior and youth athletes.

Medal summary
Complete results were published.

Boys U-20 (Junior)

†: Open event for both junior and youth athletes.

Girls U-20 (Junior)

†: Open event for both junior and youth athletes.

Boys U-18 (Youth)

‡: It is reported that there is a tie for the bronze medal in high jump.  However, it is also reported that Enzo Hodebar from Guadeloupe cleared the 2.00m in the first attempt, while Aaron Worrell from Barbados cleared the 2.00m in the third attempt, what should have broken the tie.
*: Initially, the U-18 4 × 400 m relay teams from Jamaica and the Bahamas were disqualified resulting in gold for Trinidad and Tobago, silver for the Cayman Islands (3:20.86) and bronze for Saint Kitts and Nevis (3:24.95).  However, after successful protests, both teams were reinstated in the medal ranks.

Girls U-18 (Youth)

‡: It is reported that there is a tie resulting in four bronze medallists in high jump.  However, only Sakari Famous from Bermuda and Lamara Distin from Jamaica cleared the 1.68m in the second attempt and all other heights in the first attempt.  Daejha Moss from the Bahamas cleared both the 1.68m and the 1.65m in the second attempt, while Anelia Austrie from Dominica cleared the 1.68m in the third and the 1.65m in the second attempt.  Consequently, there should be only two bronze medals.

Medal table (unofficial)

Participation
According to an unofficial count, 499 athletes from 25 countries participated.  (Relay teams not completely known).

References

External links
Facebook

CARIFTA Games
CARIFTA Games
CARIFTA Games
CARIFTA Games
CARIFTA Games
CARIFTA Games
International sports competitions hosted by Saint Kitts and Nevis